Heckington railway station is located in the village of Heckington in Lincolnshire, England. The old station building houses the Heckington Station Railway and Heritage Museum.

History
The station was opened by the Boston, Sleaford and Midland Counties Railway on 13 April 1859. It is now owned by Network Rail and managed by East Midlands Railway who provide all rail services.

Stationmasters

William Essame 1863 - 1871
Henry Porter 1871 - 1876
John Brice 1876 - 1881 (formerly station master at Great Poynton)
Thomas Money White 1881 - 1904
William H. White 1904 - 1913 (formerly station master at Deeping St James)
Herbert Joseph Osborn 1913 - 1922 (afterwards station master at Woodhall Spa)
Joseph Mills Reddish 1922 -1932 (afterwards station master at Kimberley L.N.E.R. (Notts))
H.W. Rippon 1932 - 1949 (formerly station master at Thorpe Culvert)
Norman Sigsworth 1949
S.G. Flowers 1949 - 1961 (formerly station master at Peakirk, afterwards station master at Sandy)
Arnold Cooper 1961 - 1963
W.E. Rowson from 1963 (also station master of Swineshead and Hubbert’s Bridge)

Facilities
The station is unstaffed and offers limited facilities other than two shelters, bicycle storage, timetables and modern 'Help Points'. The full range of tickets for travel are purchased from the guard on the train at no extra cost, there are no retail facilities at this station.

Services
All services at Heckington are operated by East Midlands Railway.

On weekdays and Saturdays, The station is served by an hourly service westbound to  via  and eastbound to  via .

On Sundays, the service is served by a limited service in each direction, with additional services during the summer months. Enhancements to the Sunday service are due to be made during the life of the East Midlands franchise.

References

External links
 

 Heckington Station Railway and Heritage Museum - Heckington Village Trust

Railway stations in Lincolnshire
DfT Category F2 stations
Former Great Northern Railway stations
Railway stations in Great Britain opened in 1859
Railway stations served by East Midlands Railway
Local museums in Lincolnshire
Railway museums in England